Isabel Nancy Hilton OBE (born 25 November 1949) is a Scottish journalist and broadcaster, based in London.

Early life

Hilton was educated at Edinburgh University, where she studied Chinese to post-graduate level. As Secretary of the entirely non-subversive China-Scottish Association, based at her University, Hilton was placed on MI5's "Christmas Tree" list, which prevented her from employment with the BBC in 1976. By the time the issue had been resolved, Hilton had become a feature writer for the Daily Express.

Career

Having been the Latin American affairs editor at the Sunday Times, she chose not to move to Wapping with her paper, and joined The Independent in 1986, filling the equivalent post there. Hilton joined The Guardian in 1997, where she contributed a regular column.

Hilton presented The World Tonight (1995–98) on BBC Radio 4, and from 1999 presented Nightwaves on BBC Radio 3. Concurrently from March 2005 to July 2007, she was editor and then editor-in-chief of the openDemocracy.net website and is now the editor of Chinadialogue and the Third Pole.

In 2019, Hilton delivered the annual James Cameron memorial lecture at City, University of London on the subject: Journalism with Chinese characteristics: reflections on media in the new era.

Personal life
Hilton is married to Neal Ascherson, with whom she has a son and a daughter. She was appointed Officer of the Order of the British Empire (OBE) in the 2009 Birthday Honours.

Publications 
 The Search for the Panchen Lama, W. W. Norton & Company, 2000, .

References

External links
Isabel Hilton on Twitter
Biography as editor  of Chinadialogue
Biography as a member of the Lettre Ulysses Award jury
 

1949 births
Alumni of the University of Edinburgh
BBC Radio 3 presenters
Scottish journalists
Scottish women journalists
Living people
Officers of the Order of the British Empire
People from Aberdeen
The Guardian journalists
The Sunday Times people